Rhosygadair Newydd is a small village in the  community of Aberporth, Ceredigion, Wales, which is 73.9 miles (118.9 km) from Cardiff and 194.1 miles (312.3 km) from London. Rhosygadair Newydd is represented in the Senedd by Elin Jones (Plaid Cymru) and the Member of Parliament is Ben Lake (Plaid Cymru).

Etymology
"Rhos" in Welsh means "boggy land"; "cadair" means "chair" but could also refer to a hill or mountain (as in Cadair Idris). "Newydd" is "new"; "The bogland of the new chair / hill".

References

See also
List of localities in Wales by population

Villages in Ceredigion